Giovanni Battista Durazzo (Genoa, 1565 - Genoa, 28 May 1642) was the 104th Doge of the Republic of Genoa and king of Corsica. He was an ethnic Albanian.

Biography 
Giovanni Battista Durazzo's dogate, the fifty-ninth in biennial succession and the one hundred and fourth in republican history, was inevitably conditioned by the mandate of his predecessor Agostino Pallavicini who, favoring a "naval rebirth" of the republic and more economic independence from the Spain of Philip IV, consequently,  broke the relations between the two states, forcing the doge Durazzo, considered more traditional, to a new negotiation with the Spaniards.

Inside the Genoese borders, during his dogate, the construction of the Molo Nuovo proceeded: an important 17th-century port engineering work signed by Ansaldo De Mari.

After the dogal mandate ended on July 28, 1641, Giovanni Battista Durazzo was appointed among the perpetual prosecutors after the favorable ruling of the supreme trade unions to his work. He died in Genoa on May 28 of the same year. His body was buried inside the church of Nostra Signora della Consolazione.

See also 

 Doge of Genoa
 Republic of Genoa
 Durazzo family

References 

1565 births
1642 deaths
17th-century Doges of Genoa